Dontell Jefferson (born December 15, 1983) is an American professional basketball player.  He played briefly in the National Basketball Association (NBA), as well as stints in the NBA Development League and in Canada, Latvia, and Saudi Arabia. He played college basketball for the Arkansas Razorbacks and Atlanta Metropolitan College.

College career
After two years of junior college basketball at Atlanta Metropolitan College, Jefferson completed his college career at the University of Arkansas, lettering in the 2004–05 and 2005–06 seasons. He led the team in assists in 2006 and played in the 2006 NCAA Men's Tournament.

Professional career
After his senior season, Jefferson was not selected in the 2006 NBA draft.

On March 11, 2009, Jefferson was signed to a 10-day contract by the Charlotte Bobcats. He signed a second 10-day contract on March 21. He then signed for the remainder of the 2008–09 NBA season. On October 22, 2009, Jefferson was waived by the Bobcats.

In 2012, Jefferson was drafted by the Reno Bighorns in the NBA D-League Draft. On February 22, 2013, he was traded to the Austin Toros.

In July 2013, KTP-Basket announced that Jefferson would be part of their 2013–14 roster. However, he left them before the start of the season. In April 2014, he signed with Al Hilal of Libya.

In July 2014 Jefferson signed with Al Ahly in Qatar for the 2014-2015 season.

In January 2016 Jefferson signed with Qatar Club in Qatar.

In August 2016, Jefferson signed with Al Fateh in Saudi Arabia for the 2016-2017 season. Swingman of the year and First team All Saudi Arabian team.

In November 2017, Jefferson resigns with Al Fateh in Saudi Arabia.

NBA career statistics

Regular season 

|-
| align="left" | 
| align="left" | Charlotte
| 6 || 0 || 14.0 || .500 || .500 || .667 || 2.0 || 1.5 || .7 || .2 || 4.8
|-
| align="left" | Career
| align="left" | 
| 6 || 0 || 14.0 || .500 || .500 || .667 || 2.0 || 1.5 || .7 || .2 || 4.8

References

External links
NBA D-League Profile
Profile at Eurobasket.com

1983 births
Living people
African-American basketball players
American expatriate basketball people in Canada
American expatriate basketball people in Latvia
American expatriate basketball people in Saudi Arabia
American men's basketball players
Arkansas Razorbacks men's basketball players
Austin Toros players
Basketball players from Georgia (U.S. state)
BK Barons players
Charlotte Bobcats players
Dakota Wizards players
Idaho Stampede players
Junior college men's basketball players in the United States
Laval Kebs players
People from Cordele, Georgia
People from Stone Mountain, Georgia
Reno Bighorns players
Shooting guards
Sioux Falls Skyforce players
Sportspeople from DeKalb County, Georgia
Undrafted National Basketball Association players
Utah Flash players
21st-century African-American sportspeople
20th-century African-American people